Triacylglycerol lipase can refer to:
 Triacylglycerol lipase
 pancreatic lipase
 gastric lipase
 lingual lipase